Effia is a village in the Western region of Ghana. It is about 10 kilometres from Takoradi,   the regional capital.

Boundary
The village is bounded to the west and north by Effiakuma, to the east by Fijai, and to the south by Anaji.

References

Populated places in the Western Region (Ghana)